Erigeron uniflorus is a Eurasian and North American species of flowering plant in the family Asteraceae known by the common name one-flower fleabane. It is widespread in Arctic and alpine regions in Eurasia and North America (northern Canada, Alaska, Greenland).

References

uniflorus
Flora of Europe
Flora of North America
Flora of Asia
Plants described in 1753
Taxa named by Carl Linnaeus